Nico Abegglen (born 16 February 1990) is a Swiss professional footballer who plays as a forward for SC Brühl.

Career
On 1 August 2007, Abegglen moved from FCSG U18 to St. Gallen U21. He played 2 years for youth career in U21 team. On 1 July 2009, Abegglen transferred to FC St. Gallen and played 3 seasons for team. He contracted with FC Vaduz on 25 February 2013. In 2015-16 season, Abegglen moved to FC Wohlen.

References

External links
 Profile at Swiss Football League

1990 births
Living people
Swiss men's footballers
Switzerland youth international footballers
Association football forwards
FC St. Gallen players
FC Vaduz players
Swiss expatriate footballers
Swiss expatriate sportspeople in Liechtenstein
Expatriate footballers in Liechtenstein
FC Wohlen players
Swiss Super League players
Swiss Challenge League players